V. R. Sudheesh is an Indian writer, screenwriter, translator and academic, who writes in Malayalam. He is a two-time recipient of the Kerala Sahithya Akademi Award.

Life
Sudheesh was born in Vadakara near Kozhikode in the south Indian state of Kerala. He did his pre degree from farook college and graduated in history from Madappally Government College and earned an MA in Malayalam literature from Government Brennen College, Tellicherry. He has completed M.Phil from Madras University. Subsequently, He became a teacher in colleges under SN Trust. and retired from service as the principal of Sree Narayana Guru College, Chelannoor in 2018. The writer was booked for insulting and threatening a Kozhikode-based woman publisher in June 2022.

Literary career
Sudheesh started writing at a very young age and his early works were published in the children's column of Mathrubhumi Weekly and later in Chandrika Weekly and Deshabhimani Weekly.

Awards
Sudheesh received the Kerala State Television Award for screenplay in 2005. His short story anthology, Bhavana Bhedanam fetched him the Kerala Sahitya Akademi Award for Story in 2014. Three years later, he received the 2017 Kerala Sahitya Akademi Award for Children's Literature for his work, Kurukkan Mashinte School and in 2020, he was awarded the Thoppil Ravi Award for the work, Kadukkachi Manga. He is also a recipient of C. V. Sreeraman Award, T. V. Kochubawa Award and Bheema Bala Sahitya Award. In 2020, he received the Abu Dhabi Sakthi Award in story category for his work Kadukkachi Manga.

List of works

Fiction

Children's literature

Non-fiction

References

External links 
 
 
 
 

Living people
Malayali people
People from Kozhikode district
Writers from Kozhikode
Indian male short story writers
Malayalam-language writers
Malayalam short story writers
Recipients of the Kerala Sahitya Akademi Award
20th-century Indian short story writers
21st-century Indian short story writers
20th-century Indian male writers
21st-century Indian male writers
Year of birth missing (living people)
Malayalam screenwriters
Indian translators
Indian schoolteachers
Recipients of the Abu Dhabi Sakthi Award